Brita GmbH is a German company which manufactures water filters.

The company headquarters are in Taunusstein near Wiesbaden in Hesse, Germany. Manufacturing facilities are in China, Germany, Switzerland, Italy, and the United Kingdom. Brita products are distributed in 69 countries.

Products 

Brita produces water jugs (BPA-free, made of styrene methyl methacrylate copolymer), kettles and tap attachments with integrated disposable filters. The filters can be recycled.

Their primary filtering mechanism consists of activated carbon and ion-exchange resin. The activated carbon is produced from coconut shells. According to Brita, the filters have two effects:
 The activated carbon removes substances that may impair taste, such as chlorine and chlorine compounds.
 The ion-exchange resin reduces the carbonate hardness (limescale) as well as copper and lead.

In the United Kingdom, Hinari and Breville sell electric kettles incorporating Brita technology.

History
Brita was founded in 1966 by Heinz Hankammer. The company was first named AquaDeMat before he later named the company after his daughter. The company secured the first patent for domestic water filter use in the 1970s.

In 1988, The Clorox Company, based in Oakland, California, entered in a licensing-and-distribution agreement with the German company for North and South America. In 1995, it added the Canadian rights by acquiring Canada's Brita International Holdings. In 2000, Clorox acquired the sole rights to the brand in the Americas and Brita agreed to a non-compete clause until 2005. In 2008, Brita returned to the North American market under the brand Mavea, only to withdraw again in 2016. However, products are still sold in the US under the Brita brand.

References

External links
 
 Brita UK website
 Mavea, website for Brita's U.S. brand that is not licensed to Clorox.

Water filters
Kitchenware brands
Manufacturing companies of Germany
Companies based in Hesse
Manufacturing companies established in 1966
1966 establishments in West Germany
German brands
Clorox brands
German companies established in 1966